Remigiusz Marchlewicz (born 15 January 1956) is a Polish former football player and manager who played as a defender.

References

1956 births
Living people
Footballers from Poznań
Polish footballers
Association football defenders
Lech Poznań players
Olimpia Poznań players
Warta Poznań players
Amica Wronki players
Ekstraklasa players
I liga players
Polish football managers
Lech Poznań managers